Ralph Shields (18 February 1892 – 21 November 1944) was an English professional footballer who played as a forward in the Football League for Huddersfield Town, Exeter City and Brentford.

Career 
As a young man, Shields was a miner, but played football for his local junior club Newbiggin Athletic in the Wansbeck League. In 1913, he was playing for Choppington Alliance when he was spotted by Newcastle United and was transferred to the club for a fee of £40 on 30 October 1913. Shields did not make a senior appearance for Newcastle United and in May 1914, Second Division club Huddersfield Town paid a £100 fee for his signature. The following season, 1914–15, Shields was Huddersfield Town's leading goal scorer, with 16 goals in 29 appearances.

The season after World War I, 1919–20, he was part of the Huddersfield Town team which gained promotion from the Second Division to the First Division, making 13 appearances and scoring 3 goals. In December 1920, Shields was transferred to Third Division club Exeter City in a part-exchange deal for £2,000, plus William Wright. During the remainder of the 1920–21 season, he scored 4 goals in 19 appearances. In August 1921, he was transferred to Third Division South club Brentford and made 9 appearances during the 1921–22 season, scoring one goal. This was his last season in the Football League. Shields played for Sittingbourne in the Kent League for a number of seasons, before moving back to the North East to play for Blyth Spartans in the North Eastern League.

Personal life 
As with many footballers during World War I, Shields signed up to serve and did so as a bombardier in the Royal Field Artillery. In October 1927, Shields and his family emigrated to Australia to build a new life in Concord, New South Wales. On 30 June 1940, 9 months after the outbreak of World War II, he attested in the Australian Army in Paddington and gave a false birth date of 11 September 1900, which produced an age just shy of the limit of 40. In 1942, while serving with the Australian Army Service Corps in Malaya, Shields was captured by the Imperial Japanese Army and interred as a POW in Sandakan Prisoner of War Camp, North Borneo. He died of malnutrition and beriberi on 21 November 1944 and was buried at the Labuan War Cemetery in Malaysia.

Career statistics

Honours 
Huddersfield Town

 Football League Second Division second-place promotion: 1919–20

References

 99 Years & Counting – Stats & Stories – Huddersfield Town History

1892 births
English footballers
People from Lanchester, County Durham
Footballers from County Durham
Association football forwards
English Football League players
Newcastle United F.C. players
Huddersfield Town A.F.C. players
Exeter City F.C. players
Brentford F.C. players
Australian Army personnel of World War II
Australian military personnel killed in World War II
British Army personnel of World War I
1944 deaths
English emigrants to Australia
English miners
Sittingbourne F.C. players
Blyth Spartans A.F.C. players
Fulham F.C. wartime guest players
Royal Field Artillery soldiers
Australian prisoners of war
World War II prisoners of war held by Japan
Australian people who died in prison custody
Prisoners who died in Japanese detention
Australian Army soldiers
Burials at Labuan War Cemetery
Deaths by starvation
Kent Football League (1894–1959) players